The David di Donatello for Best European Film is a category in the David di Donatello Awards, described as "Italy’s answer to the Oscars". It was awarded by the Accademia del Cinema Italiano (ACI, Academy of Italian Cinema) to recognize the most outstanding non-Italian film released in Europe during the year preceding the ceremony. The award was launched at the 2004 ceremony and cancelled after the 2018 event, following which it was incorporated into the Best Foreign Film award.

Winners and nominees
Winners are indicated in bold.

2000s
2004
 Dogville, directed by Lars von Trier (ex aequo)
 Rosenstraße, directed by Margarethe von Trotta
 Girl with a Pearl Earring, directed by Peter Webber
 Good Bye Lenin!, directed by Wolfgang Becker
 Mondays in the Sun, directed by Fernando León de Aranoa

2005
 The Sea Inside, directed by Alejandro Amenábar
 The Chorus, directed by Christophe Barratier
 Head-On, directed by Fatih Akin
 The Merchant of Venice, directed by Michael Radford
 Vera Drake, directed by Mike Leigh

2006
 Match Point, directed by Woody Allen
 Caché, directed by Michael Haneke
 L'Enfant, directed by Jean-Pierre Dardenne and Luc Dardenne
 March of the Penguins, directed by Luc Jacquet
 Mrs Henderson Presents, directed by Stephen Frears

2007
 The Lives of Others, directed by Florian Henckel von Donnersmarck
 My Best Friend, directed by Patrice Leconte
 Notes on a Scandal, directed by Richard Eyre
 The Queen, directed by Stephen Frears
 Volver, directed by Pedro Almodóvar

2008
 Irina Palm, directed by Sam Garbarski
 4 Months, 3 Weeks and 2 Days, directed by Cristian Mungiu
 The Diving Bell and the Butterfly, directed by Julian Schnabel
 Elizabeth: The Golden Age, directed by Shekhar Kapur
 The Secret of the Grain, directed by Abdel Kechiche

2009
 Slumdog Millionaire, directed by Danny Boyle
  The Class, directed by Laurent Cantet
 Lemon Tree, directed by Eran Riklis
 The Reader, directed by Stephen Daldry
 Waltz with Bashir, directed by Ari Folman

2010s
2010
 Le Concert, directed by Radu Mihăileanu
 A Prophet, directed by Jacques Audiard
 Soul Kitchen, directed by Fatih Akin
 Welcome, directed by Philippe Lioret
 The White Ribbon, directed by Michael Haneke

2011
 The King's Speech, directed by Tom Hooper
 Another Year, directed by Mike Leigh
 In a Better World, directed by Susanne Bier
 Of Gods and Men, directed by Xavier Beauvois
 The Secret in Their Eyes, directed by Juan José Campanella

2012
 The Intouchables, directed by Olivier Nakache & Éric Toledano
 The Artist, directed by Michel Hazanavicius
 Carnage, directed by Roman Polanski
 Le Havre, directed by Aki Kaurismäki
 Melancholia, directed by Lars von Trier

2013
 Amour, directed by Michael Haneke
 Anna Karenina, directed by Joe Wright
 Quartet, directed by Dustin Hoffman
 Rust and Bone, directed by Jacques Audiard
 Skyfall, directed by Sam Mendes

2014
 Philomena, directed by Stephen Frears
 Blue Is the Warmest Colour, directed by Abdellatif Kechiche
 Ida, directed by Paweł Pawlikowski
 Still Life, directed by Uberto Pasolini
 Venus in Fur, directed by Roman Polanski

2015
 The Theory of Everything, directed by James Marsh
 The Broken Circle Breakdown, directed by Felix van Groeningen
 Locke, directed by Steven Knight
 Pride, directed by Matthew Warchus
 Wild Tales, directed by Damián Szifron

2016
 Son of Saul, directed by László Nemes
 45 Years, directed by Andrew Haigh
 The Brand New Testament, directed by Jaco Van Dormael
 The Danish Girl, directed by Tom Hooper
 A Perfect Day, directed by Fernando León de Aranoa

2017
 I, Daniel Blake, directed by Ken Loach
 Florence Foster Jenkins, directed by Stephen Frears
 Julieta, directed by Pedro Almodóvar
 Sing Street, directed by John Carney
 Truman, directed by Cesc Gay

2018
 The Square, directed by Ruben Östlund
 Borg McEnroe, directed by Janus Metz
 BPM (Beats Per Minute), directed by Robin Campillo
 Elle, directed by Paul Verhoeven
 Loving Vincent, directed by Dorota Kobiela and Hugh Welchman

References

External links
 
 David di Donatello official website

David di Donatello
David di Donatello